Sister Lucy Kalappura is former nun who previously belonged to the Franciscan Clarist Congregation in Mananthavady, Wayanad.

Activism
Sister Lucy joined the Franciscan Clarist Congregation at the age of 17, after vowing to become a nun. She was criticized by the church for speaking up against Bishop Franco Mulakkal, who was then accused of multiple counts of sexual assault of another nun at Kuravilangad convent in Kerala's Kottayam district between 2014 and 2016. The bishop was arrested in 2018 on charges of rape. The congregation accused that Sr. Lucy was living a life that is against 'the principles of religious life' and the rules of the congregation. Even though she was denied permission by her superiors, she had acquired a driver's license, bought a car, published a poetry book and received remuneration for the book. She was also accused of  arriving at the convent late in the night, participating in a news channel's discussion, letting a female journalist live with her in the convent and appearing in public without wearing the nun's habit. In 2019, she received a third warning letter from the congregation, which would cause her expulsion from the convent, if she did not produce adequate reasoning for her actions.

References

21st-century Indian Roman Catholic nuns
Year of birth missing (living people)
Living people
People from Wayanad district